The Forbes Expedition was a British military expedition to capture Fort Duquesne, led by Brigadier-General John Forbes in 1758, during the French and Indian War. While advancing to the fort, the expedition built the now historic trail, the Forbes Road. The Treaty of Easton served to cause a loss of Native American support for the French, resulting in the French destroying the fort before the expedition could arrive on November 24.

Objective
Similarly to the unsuccessful Braddock Expedition early in the war, the strategic objective was the capture of Fort Duquesne, a French fort that had been constructed at the confluence of the Allegheny River and the Monongahela River in 1754. The site is now located in Pittsburgh's Golden Triangle in the downtown area.

Order of battle

Forbes commanded about 6,000 men, including a contingent of Virginians led by George Washington. Forbes, very ill, did not keep up with the advance of his army, but entrusted it to his second in command, Lieutenant Colonel Henry Bouquet, a Swiss mercenary officer commanding a battalion of the Royal American Regiment.

Forbes Road
The expedition methodically constructed Forbes Road across what is now the southern part of Pennsylvania's Appalachian Plateau region, staging from Carlisle and exploiting the climb up via one of the few southern gaps of the Allegheny through the Allegheny Front, into the disputed territory of the Ohio Country, which was then a largely-depopulated Amerindian tributary territory of the Iroquois Confederation. The well-organized expedition was in contrast to a similar expedition led by Edward Braddock in 1755, which ended in the disastrous Battle of the Monongahela.

Advance
Working for most of the summer on the construction of the road and on periodic fortified supply depots, the expedition did not come within striking distance of Fort Duquesne until September 1758. In mid-September, a reconnaissance force was soundly defeated in the Battle of Fort Duquesne when its leader, Major James Grant, attempted to capture the fort instead of gathering information alone. The French had their supply line from Montreal cut by other British actions and so attacked one of the expedition's forward outposts, Fort Ligonier, in an attempt to drive off the British or to acquire further supplies, but they were repulsed during the Battle of Fort Ligonier.

French strategic collapse
The Treaty of Easton concluded on October 26, 1758, caused the remnants of the Lenape (Delaware), Mingo, and Shawnee tribes in the Ohio Valley to abandon the French and set up the conditions that ultimately forced them to move westward once again. The collapse of Native American support made it impossible for the French to hold Fort Duquesne and the Ohio Valley. When the expedition neared to within a few miles of Fort Duquesne in mid-November, the French abandoned and blew up the fort. Three units of scouts led by Captain Hugh Waddell entered the smoking remnants of the fort under the orders of Colonel George Washington on November 24. General Forbes, who was ill with dysentery for much of the expedition, only briefly visited the ruins. He was returned to Philadelphia in a litter and died not long afterward. The collapse of Indian support and subsequent withdrawal of the French from the Ohio Country helped contribute to the "year of wonders" the string of British "miraculous" victories also known by the Latin phrase Annus Mirabilis.

See also

 Forbes Road
 Braddock Expedition
 Nemacolin's Path
 Beaver Wars
 Susquehannock peoples
 Erie peoples
 Shawnee

Notes

References

Sources
 
 
 
 Lowdermilk, Will H. (1878). History of Cumberland. Washington, DC.
 
 Sipe, C. Hale (1929). The Indian Wars of Pennsylvania. Harrisburg.

External links
 Forbes Expedition (George Washington's Mount Vernon)

Iroquoian peoples
Battles of the French and Indian War
Battles involving Canada
Battles in Pennsylvania
1758 in North America
Conflicts in 1758